Jean-Philippe Lamoureux (born August 10, 1984) is an American professional ice hockey goaltender currently playing for the EC VSV of the ICE Hockey League (ICEHL).

Playing career

Amateur
Lamoureux started his career playing three seasons with the Lincoln Stars, in the United States Hockey League, a junior ice hockey league.

He then played four years of college hockey at the University of North Dakota (2004–08), including a senior season that saw him earn a Hobey Baker Award nomination while leading the Fighting Sioux to the NCAA Frozen Four. Lamoureux is second all-time in school history with a 2.14 GAA, .920 save percentage and ten shutouts.

Professional
Lamoureux spent one season with the Alaska Aces of the ECHL,  where he was named the league's goaltender of the year. He also set an ECHL record with eight shutouts. That year, the Aces advanced to the Kelly Cup Championship where they were later defeated in 7 games by the South Carolina Stingrays.

On July 30, 2009, Lamoureux was signed by the Buffalo Sabres to a one-year contract for the 2009–10 season. He was assigned to the Sabres AHL affiliate, the Portland Pirates, for the duration of the season and in 31 games posted 14 wins. Immediately preceding the Pirates' elimination from the Calder Cup playoffs, Lamoureux was recalled to the Sabres reserve squad for the Stanley Cup playoffs that year. He was not re-signed by the Sabres organization and went on to sign with the Calgary Flames AHL affiliate, the Abbotsford Heat, on July 22, 2010.

On May 12, 2012, after his debut season abroad in the EBEL with Slovenian team, HDD Olimpija Ljubljana, Lamoureux joined Austrian competitor club, EC VSV.

Family 
The Lamoureux family has six siblings who all play ice hockey at an elite level. Jean-Philippe, born 1984, is the oldest child in the family. His younger brother, Jacques, born 1986, previously played professional hockey in the ECHL with the Alaska Aces. His next brother, Pierre-Paul, born 1987, played three years of defence in the Western Hockey League with the Red Deer Rebels. The next brother, Mario, born 1988, was an NCAA forward and captain at the University of North Dakota and then played professionally in the ECHL, AHL and in Europe. His twin sisters Jocelyne and Monique won gold medals with Team USA at the 2018 Winter Olympics.

Career statistics

Awards and honours

References

External links

1984 births
Living people
Abbotsford Heat players
Alaska Aces (ECHL) players
American men's ice hockey goaltenders
HDD Olimpija Ljubljana players
Ice hockey people from North Dakota
Lincoln Stars players
Sportspeople from Grand Forks, North Dakota
Portland Pirates players
North Dakota Fighting Hawks men's ice hockey players
EC Red Bull Salzburg players
Utah Grizzlies (ECHL) players
Vienna Capitals players
EC VSV players
American expatriate ice hockey players in Austria
American expatriate ice hockey players in Canada
American expatriate ice hockey players in Slovenia
American people of French-Canadian descent